Kalyanam Mudhal Kadhal Varai  ( From Marriage till love) is a 2014 Indian Tamil-language soap opera that aired on Vijay TV. The show was launched on 3 November 2014 to 27 January 2017 for 600 episodes and aired Monday through Friday evenings. This series was remake of Hindi serial Ye Hai Mohabbatein and stars Divyanka Tripathi Dahiya and Karan Patel portraying Dr.Ishita and Raman.

The show stars Priya Bhavani Shankar (who later replaced by Chaitra Reddy) with Amit Bhargav in the lead roles, Whilst Nivahsni Shyam in the supporting role. The show was directed by Thai Selvam and has dialogues written by Marudhu Shankar. The music is composed by Arun Prabhakar. The show is completely based on the Hindi show Ye Hai Mohabbatein, which is aired on Star Plus and is partly based on Manju Kapur's novel Custody and it concluded on 27 January 2017. The pair was known as #Arjiya or #Arya on social networking sites. Unfortunately in the end of 2016, actress Priya was quit the show due to her contract expiring, so she was replaced by newcomer actress Chaitra Reddy. Meanwhile the ratings tanked and the show was abruptly cancelled.

Set in Chennai, the show follows the love story of Priya, a Malayali and Arjun, a Tamilian who lives next door as they marry each other for Pooja, their relationship blossoms.

Plot 

Following a divorce from his unfaithful wife Vandhana (Vandana), after her affair with his boss Ashok, CEO Arjun Swaminathan is a bitter man, but he loves his daughter, Pooja. Dr. Priya Unnikrishnan, a dentist who lives next door, also loves Pooja. Unable to have children of her own, she has been unable to find a partner willing to marry an infertile woman. Vandhana and Ashok win custody of Aditya (called Adi), Arjun's elder son and also try to take custody of Pooja from Arjun. Priya and Arjun put aside their dislike of each other to marry to protect the little girl and ultimately win custody of the child. Ashok tries to take revenge, convincing Arjun that Pooja is not his daughter until Priya realizes what's going on and uses a DNA test to resolve Arjun's doubts.

After this, Priya became the target of sexual predator Eashvar, who is the husband of Arjun's younger sister Sukanya. Eashvar convinces Sukanya that it is Priya who is attracted to him, sowing discord in the family and causing Priya's family to take her away. Realizing that Priya is innocent, Arjun successfully plots to place Eashvar in jail for his crimes, while Ashok and Sukanya seek to do what they can to free him.

Meanwhile, Arjun's colleague and good friend Jai is preparing to marry Kaviya after a family feud broke up his relationship with Priya's cousin Vaishali (called Vaishu). Their friends plot to get the couple back together. A drama takes place and Jai is engaged to Vaishali. Kavya loves Karthi, Arjun's lawyer. Kaviya is engaged to him. Manju, Priya's mom, meets with an accident caused by Adi unknowingly. Arjun finds out that it was Adi who was responsible for the accident. Vandhana is ready to take the blame on her to protect her son. Arjun begins to support Vandhana which hurts Priya a lot. She files a case against Vandhana. In the court, Arjun takes Vandhana's side. However, Priya learns that Adi has done the accident and apologizes to Arjun. Arjun gets punishment for Adi by sending him to a boys' rehab centre.

Arjun plans a picnic for Priya. Unfortunately Priya fractures her hand and Arjun takes care of Priya. Arjun becomes the President of South India CEO's association. Aravind, Ashok brother, come to Priya's clinic for a surgery. Arjun fights with him as he behaves rudely with Priya. To take revenge Aravind cancels Priya's medical license. Arjun promises to get her license back. Ashok demands the President's post to give the license back. Arjun agrees to it and Priya gets her license back. However, Priya learns that Arjun gave the President post to Ashok for getting back her licence. Priya plots against Ashok and successfully gets the President post back for Arjun. Pooja wants to celebrate Raksha Bhandhan with her elder brother Adi. Arjun promises to take her to Ashok's place, where Adi lives with Vandhana. There he finds Ashok's friend misbehaving with Vandhana. Arjun saves Vandhana and Pooja ties the Rakhi on Adi's hand. After Aravind's arrival, Ashok plans to throw Vandhana out of his house and marry Vaishali, who is also his employee. Meanwhile, Eashwar files a divorce. Sukanya comes home and makes a scene. Swaminathan, Arjun's dad snubs Sukanya for creating a commotion in the house about Eashwar. Eashwar taunts Priya when she meets him to talk about Sukanya.

Jai and Vaishu plan to get married. However, in the register office, Jai's sister has given a letter, opposing the marriage. Everyone is puzzled as Jai has always said that he is an orphan. Vaishali questions Arjun about the whereabouts of Jai's sister. Priya secretly finds out find out Jai's sister and plans to reveal it to everyone during his marriage function. However, during the function, a big drama takes place and Jai is forced to confess that his sister is none other than Vandhana. It later turns out that it was all an elaborate plan made by Vandhana. She wanted him to acknowledge her as his sister, as he had cut all relations with her after she had betrayed Arjun and gone with Ashok.

Following this, Priya meets her old friend Abhijeet (called Biju), making Arjun jealous. Priya introduces Biju to Arjun, who feels that she likes Biju more than him, and is initially cold to him. Priya falls unconscious during a puja. Manoj, Arjun's younger brother blames for not taking care of her. The doctor questions Biju and Arjun about her past medical reports. Arjun is surprised to know that Priya had tuberculosis when she was in the 12th grade. Later Priya regains her consciousness. Biju advises Arjun on how to be a good husband which leaves Arjun angry. Arjun joins hands with a thief and plots against Biju to show him in bad light. All his plans fail and Priya is furious at Arjun for his cheap act.

Anu, Priya's clinic assistant is now pregnant because of Manoj. Anu confides in Manoj who asks her to abort the baby. Anu is shattered and vows to ruin his life and sends a court order to Manoj. Arjun and Priya try explaining to Anu about the current situation but Anu is firm in her decision of not aborting the baby. Ashok takes advantage of this situation and helps Anu. A series of incidents occur by chance, which leaves Arjun doubting Priya and Biju. Biju promises Priya that he would talk to Anu and Manoj. Both agree to marry after Biju's advise. Priya is immensely happy and thankfully cries "I love you Biju" for solving all the problems which is overheard by Arjun, though she only said it in a friendly way. Arjun shatters down hearing this. He recollects his past with Vandhana and fears that Priya too will betray him. A drunk Arjun is found on the road. Priya and Biju reach the spot. They take a drunk Arjun home. Arjun is furious about the two being very close. Ashok and Aravind ploy and direct Eeshwar to persuade Sukanya to counsel Manoj to back away from his decision.

Meanwhile, Arjun is elected as the President of the South East Asian CEOs' Association. Biju and Priya invite Anu to the ceremony. Sukanya rebukes Manoj for his decision of supporting Anu and asks him to leave the city for a few days. Anu gets worried when Manoj doesn't answer her calls. Later, she panics hearing about Manoj's accident. During his speech at the function, he gives all the credit to Vandhana for his success and thanks her. Priya gets upset and leaves. Arjun finds Priya and Biju holding hands and misunderstands their relationship. He taunts them, leaving Priya and Biju fuming. Ashok is left furious as Biju warns him against betraying Vandhana and asks him to marry her, failing which he will cancel the contract given to Ashok's company. Later, Sukanya is shocked on learning about Ashok's plans against Arjun from Anu. She tells Arjun about Priya and Biju's actions which resolved Arjun's problem. Arjun feels guilty for doubting Priya and apologises to her. Priya learns from Biju about Pooja being ragged in school. Arjun begs Priya to forgive him. His friendliness towards Biju wins Priya's pardon. Vaishali requests Priya to convince Arjun to attend Vandhana's wedding party. Priya rejoices as Arjun gifts her a gold necklace and wears the bracelet she had bought for him. Arjun selects a dress for Priya but Vandhana, too, likes the same dress. Arjun gifts it to Priya and insists that she wear it to the party. Priya learns about Vandhana's interest over the same dress. She gives the dress to Vandhana and wears a sari instead for the party. Later, Arjun fumes on seeing Vandhana in the dress that he had lovingly gifted to Priya. Later, when Ashok, being forced by Biju, proposes to Vandhana in front of everyone, Arjun is surprised as Priya holds his hand. Priya dances for Arjun at their residence and they share a moment of bliss. Arjun teases Priya at first but later praises her dance performance.

Meanwhile, Vaishali, who is fed up of Ashok's proposals to her, vows to reveal Ashok's true colours to Vandhana before the wedding takes place. However, at the engagement party, she finds herself in a fix as she inadvertently antagonises Jai. Sukhanya is irritated seeing Eashwar at Ashok and Vandhana's engagement. Pooja slams into Vandhana who, in turn, spoils Ashok's attire with the mehendi on her hand. Priya is angry with Vandhana for trying to slap Pooja. Priya obliges to Jai and Vaishali's request to keep her anger aside and grace Vandhana's engagement. Arjun seeks Bala's help indirectly to get him close to Priya. Bala gives Arjun a book on intimacy, to induce intimacy in his life. Vandhana refuses to oblige to Arjun's request of giving Aditya's custody over to him after she weds Ashok. Meanwhile, Ashok panics as Vandhana proclaims that she will marry him only if he legally adopts Aditya. Eashwar provokes Aditya against Priya. Aditya lodges a false complaint against Priya to avenge Vandhana's insult. Biju is shocked to see the police at the function hall. Later, Biju tells Priya about the police and learns that Aditya filed the complaint. Sukanya learns about Eeshwar's ploy and scolds him. Arjun threatens Aditya and makes him confess his misdeed. Later, Priya gets released from police custody after Aditya's confession. Arjun praises Priya for her maturity and they share a light moment on their way back home. Later Vandhana requests Priya to forgive her and invites her to the spinster party she's throwing. Eashwar again plots again Priya and manipulates Aditya into sending a wrong text to Priya to mislead her. Priya goes the bachelor party which Ashok is throwing by mistake and is misbehaved with by people there. Biju and Arjun arrive there at the right time and save her. Priya breaks down completely. However, she recovers under Arjun's care.

The day of Ashok's wedding arrives and he desperately tries to avoid his marriage to Vandhana. Vaishali tries to prove the original face of Ashok to Vandhana, She makes a drama and tries to make Ashok confess his feelings for her. But Ashok understands Vaishu's plan and mixes a sleeping tablet in her juice. Then he makes everyone believe that he had been intimate with her and calls off the wedding. Vandana is crazy that Priya and Vaishu spoilt her life. Vaishu is shattered after this incident. Every one including Sukanya starts looking out for the real culprit. Sukanya plays a plot and learns from Eashwar that Vaishu is still a virgin and the drama was executed by Ashok to cancel his marriage to Vandhana. At Pooja's school, during a fight, Jai attacks Aravind, leaving him hospitalized. Ashok threatens Vaishu to lodge a complaint against Jai and blackmails her into marrying him. Arjun and Priya's families are devastated after learning this. Ashok throws Vandhana and Adi out of his house. Finding them on the road, Priya and Arjun bring them to their house. Vandhana plans to sow discord between Priya and Arjun and aims to unite again with Arjun after throwing Priya out of the house. However, much to her disappointment, Arjun and Priya have started falling in love with each other with her every move bringing them closer and closer. Meanwhile, there are some financial problems for Unnikrishnan. Arjun decides to give Unnikrishnan a job. (As of September).

Problems resume when Manoj learns that he is incapable of becoming a father after an accident after a test taken by the doctors. Unfortunately, doctors also let him down by saying that there is no treatment for this as of now. Vandana learns of it and fakes a doctor and gives his number to Manoj to call him for his remedy. Manoj does so and he claims five lakhs for the treatment. Manoj is tempted to steal from the office, upon Vandana's advice and leaves for Bangalore for treatment. Here Unnikrishnan is suspected for the money loss and police eventually investigate him in a function in front of the other relative which puts him in embarrassment. Manoj is caught red-handed, beaten and abandoned by his own family in his own house. Meanwhile, Priya finds a suitable groom for Arjun's sister and convince her to marry. Vandana learns that the groom is already married but bashes him in the marriage hall with her ex-wife (but not still divorced) only to put Arjun's family into miserable position by stopping the marriage. The groom is then thrown out.

Manoj then exposes Vandana and her misdeeds and they all throw her out. Vandana challenges revenge towards them stubbornly. Seeing her furious, Arjun decides to get the custody of Adhi legally, which Vandana gets devastated. She plots an agreement with Arjun acceding to Arjun's demand and quoting Pooja for Adhi instead in that agreement diplomatically and rather quoting it in clandestine. Arjun's lawyer Karthik without going through it properly presents it to Arjun which he signs. Vandana now demands Pooja quoting the statement in it. Priya gets devastated and pleads Vandana not to demand Pooja, since Pooja cannot imagine living without her and vice versa. Priya goes to the extent of begging Vandana and falling at her but Vandana nevertheless stays stubborn over her decision. Vandana hires a successful lawyer for this case. After depression and nightmares of losing Pooja, Priya decides to evade with Pooja, while the latter is completely innocent of what is going on. Knowing that Priya has absconded with Pooja, Vandana adds a feather to her cap making her side stronger and filing a criminal charge against the Priya for her act.

After twists of events, Priya gets back to Arjun family with her broken leg (in the accident meanwhile). The next day hearing proceeds and Vandana succeeds in getting Pooja into her custody. Adhi sees Vandana's lawyer in his school function and picks up a quarrel with his son, blaming his father as a prosecutor who helped Vandana in separating Priya from Pooja. But his son counters saying his father is rather a great, honest and a fair lawyer. Now Vandana's lawyer becomes conscientious learning about his own son's belief about him, feels guilty for being otherwise. He then promises to support Priya to get back her child and Priya becomes highly delightful. Meanwhile, Adhi develops a complex and is heartbroken thinking that he is unwanted by Vandana as well as Arjun's family and bursts out to Arjun about it. Moreover, the psychiatrist advises Adhi to be in Priya's custody for his better future and for his better mental health. Arjun then decides to retain Adhi first and then to fight for Pooja's custody later.

Priya plays a game to calm down Pooja by running out of town. Arjun intellectually as well as with his usual humorous way finds Priya at her friend's home and takes her back to Chennai. He makes her to stay away from the family by renting a flat in chennai. Meanwhile, Adhi too starts calling Priya as Priyama and he helps Priya to win back Pooja's love.

The story was completely changed due to Priya's exit.

Priya, Pooja and Arjun leave for a trip and Malli character is introduced in the story and the story deviates form Ye Hai Mohabbatein. The story ends with Arjun and Priya finally confessing their love for each other and Arjun shows a report to Priya which shows that she can become a mother on her own and Pooja and Adhi in their custody.

Cast

Main
 Priya Bhavani Shankar (2014-2016) as Dr. Priya Arjun: Manju and Unni's younger daughter, Arjun's second wife, Aditya and Pooja's stepmother
 Chaitra Reddy (2017) as Dr. Priya Arjun (Replacement of Priya)
 Amit Bhargav as Mr. Arjun Swaminathan (2014-2017): Dhanalakshmi and Swaminathan's elder son, Dr. Priya's husband, Vandana's ex-husband, Ashok's ex-employee and his arch-rival; Aditya, and Pooja’s father. 
 Amit also portrayed as Malli, a local gangster, Arjun's imposter in 2017.
 Nivahsni Shyam as Pooja Arjun: Daughter of Arjun and Vandhana, Priya's stepdaughter
 Anandh Ram as Aditya Arjun: Son of Arjun and Vandhana, Priya's stepson
 Vandana Michael as Vandana, Arjun's ex-wife, Ashok's ex-girlfriend, Pooja and Aditya's mother

Supporting
 Nathan Shyam as Ashok Kumar, Arjun's business rival, Vandhana's ex-boyfriend and Vaishali's husband
 Lokesh Baskaran as Jai: Arjun's best friend, Vandana's younger brother and Vaishali's ex-boyfriend, Kavya's ex-fiancée and Shruti's husband
 VJ Vaishali Vijay (2014-Oct.2015) → Vanitha Hariharan (2015-2017) as Vaishali Ashok Kumar: Vaidehi's daughter, Kavitha and Priya's cousin sister, Jai's ex-girlfriend and Ashok's wife
 Vishwam as Unnikrishnan: Manju's husband, Kavitha and Priya's father, Vaishali's uncle
 Sadhana as Manjula Unnikrishnan: Unni's wife, Kavitha and Priya's mother, Vaishali's aunt
 Ravishankar as Swaminathan: Dhanalakshmi's husband, Sukanya, Arjun, Manoj and Shruti's father, Pooja, Aditya’s grandpa
 Kuyili (2014–Oct.16) as Dhanalakshmi Swaminathan "Dhanam": Swami's wife, Sukanya, Arjun, Manoj and Shruti's mother, Pooja, Aditya’s grandma
 Revathee Shankar (2016-2017) as Dhanam (Replacement of Kuyili)
 Manoj Kumar as Manoj Swaminathan: Dhanam and Swami's younger son, Arjun's younger brother and who was one-sidedly loved Vaishali.
 Syamantha Kiran as Sukanya Eshwar: Dhanam and Swami's elder daughter, Arjun's elder sister and Eshwar's wife, Ananya’s mother
 Isvar Raghunath as Eshwar: Sukanya's husband and Ananya’s father
 S.Kavitha as Kavitha Balakrishnan: Unni and Manju's elder daughter, Priya's elder sister and Bala's wife, Shravan’s mother
 Kadhal Kannan as Balakrishnan: Kaveri's elder son, Subbu’s older brother, Kavitha's husband and Shravan’s father
 Myna Nandhini (2014-Aug.2015) → Rhema Ashok (2015-2017) as Shruti Jai: Dhanam and Swami's younger daughter, Arjun's younger sister and Jai's wife
 Karthik Sasidharan as Aravind Kumar, Ashok's younger brother.
 Badekkila Pradeep as Abijith "Biju": Priya's childhood friend
 Karthick Vasudevan as Karthik: Arjun's lawyer and his best friend, Kavya's boyfriend
 Anu Sulash (2014–May.16) → Haripriya Vignesh Kumar (2016–17) as Anuradha Manoj Kumar: Priya's clinic assistant
 Pavithra Janani as Kavya Karthick: Jai's ex-fiancée, Karthick's wife
 Siddharth Kumar as Subbu: Kaveri's younger son, Bala's younger brother and Priya's ex-fiancée
 Usha Elizabeth as Kaveri: Bala and Subbu’s mother
 Priya Manjuathan as Ramya Joseph
 Anees Shaz as Subbu
 VJ Apsara as Ragini: Subbu’s wife
 Rekha Suresh as Vaidehi: Manju's younger sister, Vaishali's mother
 "Soodhu Kavvum" Sivakumar as Shiva
 Sridevi Ashok (2017) as Swapna: Malli's wife

Guests
 Sivaranjani as Sivaranjani – Arjun's childhood friend (2016)

Reception
Priya Bhavani Shankar and Amit Bhargav won the Best Find of the Year Award at the 2015 Vijay Telly Awards for their roles in KMKV. On YouTube, the official Channel of the serial "Kalyanam Mudhal Kaadhal Varai" has 575,184 subscribers as of November 2016.  In January 2017, Priya's contract ended and she was replaced by Chaitra Reddy.  With declining ratings, the makers decided to cancelled the show in January 2017.

Awards and honours

References

Notes
1.^" Official Website". Retrieved 2016-07-21

2. ^"KMKV set to witness interesting twists -The Times of India". Retrieved 2016-07-21

3.^"Vijay TV set to strengthen prime time band"- Indian Television. Retrieved 2016-07-21

4.^"This recognition is very special:Amit Bhargav" – The Times of India. Retrieved 2016-07-21

External links
Official website
 

Star Vijay original programming
Tamil-language romance television series
2014 Tamil-language television series debuts
Tamil-language television shows
2017 Tamil-language television series endings
Tamil-language television series based on Hindi-language television series